Vedappan is a 2009 Tamil language drama film directed by Aanaivari A. Sridhar. The film stars Hemanth Kumar, newcomer Apsara and newcomer Nikitha, with Vennira Aadai Moorthy, Balu Anand, Mahanadi Shankar, Crane Manohar and Sabitha Anand playing supporting roles. It was released on 9 October 2009.

Plot

In a village, Vedappan works in a tea stall owned by Panneer and he is also a hardcore fan of cinema actress Deepika. He wants to meet Deepika by any means and an aspiring director promises him to make him a hero. In the meantime, the flower seller Kanaka falls in love with Vedappan. Vedappan then gets a small role in Deepika's film. During the shooting, instead of shooting towards Deepika with a replica gun, Vedappan shoots her with a real gun and Deepika is wounded on the shoulder. Vedappan then escapes from the shooting spot and Deepika is admitted to the hospital. Thereafter, the police arrest Vedappan and he is forced to tell them the reason for shooting her.

In the past, Vedappan and his widow father were poor workers who repaired metal vessels while Deepika was a poor karakattam dancer who lived with her widow mother. Despite being a street dancer, Deepika wanted to be treated with dignity and Vedappan was deeply in love with her. Deepika and her mother then left the village without notice. Afterwards, Vedappan learns that she had become a cinema actress in Chennai. One day, Vedappan saw Deepika's sex tape video and he was flabbergasted by it, so he decided to kill her.

The police tell him that the video was morphed and the girl in the video was not Deepika thus Vedappan realises his mistake and he is released. The film ends with Vedappan accepting Kanaka's love.

Cast

Hemanth Kumar as Vedappan
Apsara as Deepika
Nikitha as Kanaka
Vennira Aadai Moorthy as Panneer
Balu Anand as Vedappan's father
Mahanadi Shankar
Crane Manohar as an aspiring director
Sabitha Anand as Deepika's mother
Muthukaalai
Nellai Siva as Annachi
Halwa Vasu
Sampath
Raja Rishi as Thulasi
Yahesh
C. S. Sukumar
Antony Cruz
Antony Raj
Aanaivari A. Sridhar in a cameo appearance

Production

Aanaivari A. Sridhar made his directorial debut with Vedappan under PRK Movies banner. Hemanth Kumar, who acted in Vasool (2008), was chosen to play the male lead while newcomer Arundhati  (credited as Apsara) from Bangalore and newcomer Nikitha were selected to play heroines. Mahanadi Shankar, Vennira Aadai Moorthy and Balu Anand roped to play significant roles. Nesan composed the music, D. Maghibalan took care of camera work and the editing was by S. Satish. The film was shot in 30 days.

Soundtrack

The film score and the soundtrack were composed by Nesan. The soundtrack features 5 tracks with lyrics written by Ilaya Kamban, Annamalai, Sundran, Antony Cruz and Jayakondan. The audio was released on 29 June 2009 in Chennai. Actor Prashanth, Sivasakthi Pandian, V. C. Guhanathan and Suresh Joachim attended the audio launch.

References

2009 films
2000s Tamil-language films
Indian drama films
2009 directorial debut films
2009 drama films